The Czech Republic is a European Parliament constituency for elections in the European Union covering the member state of Czech Republic. It is currently represented by twenty-one Members of the European Parliament.

Current Members of the European Parliament

Elections

2004

The 2004 European election was the sixth election to the European Parliament. However, as the Czech Republic had only joined the European Union earlier that month, it was the first election European election held in that state.

On a very low turnout, the ruling Czech Social Democratic Party suffered a heavy defeat, losing ground to both the conservative Civic Democratic Party and the Communist Party of Bohemia and Moravia. Debacle of his party was one of reasons for resignation of Prime Minister Vladimír Špidla. Full results;

2009

The 2009 European election was the seventh election to the European Parliament and the second for the Czech Republic.

2014

The 2014 European election was the eighth election to the European Parliament and the third for the Czech Republic.

2019

The 2019 European election was the ninth election to the European Parliament and the fourth for the Czech Republic.

References

External links
 European Election News by European Election Law Association (Eurela)
 List of MEPs europarl.europa.eu

European Parliament elections in the Czech Republic
European Parliament constituencies
2004 establishments in the Czech Republic
Constituencies established in 2004
Electoral districts of the Czech Republic